Alec the Great was a syndicated newspaper gag panel created by Edwina Dumm and featuring a dog character (as did her other comic strip, Cap Stubbs and Tippie). It ran from 1931 to 1969.

Characters and story
In Alec the Great, Dumm illustrated verses written by her brother, Robert Dennis Dumm, about the small dog, Alec. Their collaboration was published as a book, Alec the Great: 1,001 Verses - Wise, Witty and Cheerful (Crown, 1946). Comics historian Maurice Horn notes that Alec looked exactly like Tippie.

Another dog book by Edwina Dumm was Sinbad: A Dog's Life, published by Coward McCann in 1930. Alec and Tippie both looked like Sinbad, who was based on Dumm's real-life dog Sinbad.

References

Sources

American comic strips
1931 comics debuts
1969 comics endings
Fictional dogs
Comics about dogs
American comics characters
Gag-a-day comics
Gag cartoon comics
Comics characters introduced in 1931
Male characters in comics